Simon Ateba is a Cameroonian journalist who is the White House correspondent for Today News Africa. He has attracted controversy for his disputes with White House Press Secretary Karine Jean-Pierre, whom he has accused of not calling on reporters from smaller news outlets for questions during daily press briefings.

Biography 
Ateba was born in Cameroon. He is proficient in five languages: French, English, Ewondo, Manguissa, and Yoruba.

Career 
Ateba worked for The NEWS magazine in Nigeria for nine years.

He appeared in the documentary "Nigeria's Millionaire Preachers", about religion becoming a big business in Nigeria, in 2011. By then, Ateba had been investigating the link between religion and money in Nigeria for about five years, and had been beaten up at least once during those investigations. 

On August 28, 2015, Ateba was arrested by Cameroonian authorities and accused of spying for Boko Haram as he investigated the living conditions of Nigerian refugees camped in the country's north. Ateba was based in Lagos, Nigeria, and had traveled to Cameroon after receiving a grant from the International Center for Investigative Reporting in Abuja, to investigate the ordeals and suffering of Nigerians who had fled to Cameroon following Boko Haram attacks on their communities. He was released after being detained for four days. Ateba's arrest and detention were condemned by the Cameroon Journalism Trade Union

White House
In December 2021, Ateba questioned Jen Psaki about the Omicron-linked travel ban President Biden imposed on eight African nations, and in March 2022, he asked the White House for comments on the Will Smith–Chris Rock slapping incident at the 2022 Academy Awards ceremony. In December 2022, Ateba had a tense exchange with Karine Jean-Pierre at the White House.

On March 3, 2023, Ateba stated on Twitter that he had been removed from the White House Correspondents' Association.

On March 20, 2023, Ateba shouted at Karine Jean-Pierre during a Press Conference that included the cast of the comedy series Ted Lasso. Ateba claimed that Jean-Pierre had discriminated against him by not calling on him during her seven month tenure as White House Press Secretary.

References

External links
 

Living people
Cameroonian journalists
21st-century journalists
Year of birth missing (living people)